Kamsale is a unique folk art performed by the devotees of God Mahadeshwara. Kamsale is a brass made musical instrument. Its origin is traced to the Mythological period.

Instrument and group 
Kamsale is a rhythm instrument. These instruments are played in pairs. Its size is about a man's palm. They are throated at the centre. One which is convex in shape is held in one hand, very closely; (usually the left hand). The other one is held at length. (usually in the right hand). The artists in the Kamsale group vary from three to eight. If the Kamsale is accompanied by songs, the number of artists will be from 8 to 12.

Background 
"Kamsale" popularly known as "Devaraguddas" belongs to Halumatha Kuruba Gowda community are the disciples of Lord Mahadeshwara. Kamsale Mela is a popular folk song which deals with the history of 'Mahadeshwara' (worshipping deity) of Mahadeshwara hills, a renowned pilgrim centre, situated in Chamarajanagar district

Literature 
Kamsale artists have no printed literature. They learn those songs orally. They participate in fairs, which are held in Mahadeshwara hills during Diwali, Shivaratri and Ugadi festivals.

Kuruba Gowda people 
Kamsale is closely connected with a tradition of Shiva worship. The artistes, drawn from Haalumatha Kuruba Gowda community. Who have vowed to live a life of devotion to Mahadeshwara are supposed to perform kamsale. The dance is a part of a 'diiksha' or oath and is taught by teacher or spiritual leader. Kamsale Mahadevaiah of Mysore was a famous artist. He trained students at university level. In cultural exchange programme of India, he toured many countries and performed.

Dress and dance 
The singing artists wear a special dress. The artists, with the Kamsale in the left hand, expose it to be hit by the Kamsale held in the right hand. Thus rhythm is created of various patterns and tempos. Beesu Kamsale or Kamsale dance is a unique dance form in which religious fervour combines with martial dexterity. The instruments, in the course of the vigorous rhythmic beatings are moved around the body of the dancer in innumerable patterns manifesting both skill and art. The main element in art is the rhythmic clang, which blends with the melodious music of the Mahadeshwara epic. In a group movement the dancer provides the vision of a series of offensive and defensive manoeuvers, which is a testimony to the Kuruba people being of Martial stock.

Spread 
The Kamsale dancers are found in the Kannada, Mysore, Kollegal, Bangalore, Chamarajanagar, hassan and Mandya region.

External links 
Folk Dances
Folk Art & Dances of Karnataka
Photo
Kuruba Gowda

Dances of India
Culture of Karnataka